The 2016 Missouri Western Griffons football team represented Missouri Western State University in the 2016 NCAA Division II football season. The Griffons played their home games on Craig Field in Spratt Stadium in St. Joseph, Missouri, as they have done since 1970. 2016 was the 47th season in school history. The Griffons were led by twentieth-year head coach, Jerry Partridge. Missouri Western has been a member of the Mid-America Intercollegiate Athletics Association since 1989.

Preseason
The Griffons entered the 2016 season after finishing 2015 with a 6–5 record overall and in conference play, under Partridge. On August 2, 2016 at the MIAA Football Media Day, the Griffons were chosen to finish in 7th place in both the Coaches Poll and Media Poll.

Personnel

Coaching staff
Along with Partridge, there were 8 assistants.

Roster

Schedule

Source:

Game summaries

Nebraska–Kearney

Missouri Southern

Central Missouri

Central Oklahoma

Northeastern State

Lindenwood

Pittsburg State

Fort Hays State

Washburn

Emporia State

Northwest Missouri State

References

Missouri Western
Missouri Western Griffons football seasons
Missouri Western Griffons football